Derozio Memorial College, established in 1996, is a  Hons and General degree college in Rajarhat. It offers undergraduate courses in Arts, Sciences and Commerce.  It is affiliated to West Bengal State University.

Departments

Science

Chemistry
Physics
Mathematics 
Botany
Zoology
Computer Science

Arts and Commerce

Bengali
English 
History
Political Science
Philosophy
Economics
Education
Journalism
Commerce
Business organization
Accountancy

Central Library 
The fully automated wifi enabled Central Library of the college contains almost 15000 books, 600 serial publications, 120 CD & DVDs. Daily footfall in the library amounts to 108 on an average. The Library subscribes Bengali and English newspapers on daily basis and the papers thus subscribed are preserved in bound volumes monthly basis in the form of newspaper archive. In house researchers including faculty members, students and others visit the library on daily basis to study  newspapers from the archive for their different research purposes. The well-maintained Online Public Access Catalogue is accessible 24×7 hours from any corners of the world. The Central Library of the college subscribes NLIST databases INFLIBNET for the faculty members, staff and students of the college. The library maintains institutional Membership with the renowned libraries such as The American Library Kolkata, National Digital Library. All the regular facilities such as Reading Room, Reference Services, CAS, Reprography, Internet etc. are provided to the users from the library. Ex-students of the college can be a member of the library for initially one year by paying a very nominal fees to the library.

Accreditation
Derozio Memorial College is recognized by the University Grants Commission (UGC). It was accredited by the National Assessment and Accreditation Council (NAAC), and in 2016 the college has been awarded B++ grade.

See also
Education in India
List of colleges in West Bengal
Education in West Bengal

References

External links
Derozio Memorial College

Universities and colleges in North 24 Parganas district
Colleges affiliated to West Bengal State University
Educational institutions established in 1996
1996 establishments in West Bengal